The Diocese of Hereford is a Church of England diocese based in Hereford, covering Herefordshire, southern Shropshire and a few parishes within Worcestershire in England, and a few parishes within Powys and Monmouthshire in Wales. The cathedral is Hereford Cathedral and the bishop is the Bishop of Hereford. The diocese is one of the oldest in England (created in 676 and based on the minor sub-kingdom of the Magonsæte) and is part of the Province of Canterbury.

Bishops
The diocesan Bishop of Hereford (Richard Jackson) was, until 2020, assisted by the Bishop suffragan of Ludlow (which see was created in 1981) — it has been announced that the suffragan See is not to be filled. The provincial episcopal visitor (for parishes in this diocese – among twelve others in the western part of the Province of Canterbury – who reject the ministry of priests who are women, since 1994) is the Bishop suffragan of Ebbsfleet, who is licensed as an honorary assistant bishop of the diocese in order to facilitate his work there.

Three retired bishops are licensed as assistant bishops in the diocese:

Michael Westall (Bishop of South West Tanganyika) lives in Kingstone, Herefordshire.

David Thomson, (Bishop of Huntingdon), lives in Hereford.

Michael Bourke (Bishop of Wolverhampton) also lives in the diocese.

Statistics
As reported in the Church of England's Statistics for Mission 2018, published in October 2019, the diocese had a population of 331,000, fewer than any other except Sodor and Man. With 402 churches, the population per church was 820, the lowest of any diocese and less than 60% of the 1420 in the next lowest, St Edmundsbury and Ipswich.  Average weekly church attendance was 8,700, a new low, down from 9,300 in 2017.  The total worshipping community was estimated at 13,300, up from 11,700 in 2014, and 44% of these were aged over 70 years.

Archdeaconries and deaneries 
The following deanery mergers have taken place:

 Kington and Weobley before 1972
 Ross and Archenfield before 1979

*including Cathedral

Churches 
Last updated 25 November 2020.

Outside deanery structures

Deanery of Abbeydore

Deanery of Bromyard

Deanery of Hereford

Deanery of Kington and Weobley

Closed churches in the area

Deanery of Ledbury

Deanery of Leominster

Deanery of Ross and Archenfield

Deanery of Bridgnorth

Deanery of Clun Forest

Deanery of Condover

Deanery of Ludlow

Deanery of Pontesbury

Deanery of Telford Severn Gorge

References

Sources
Haydn's Book of Dignities (1894) Joseph Haydn/Horace Ockerby, reprinted 1969
 Whitaker's Almanack 1883 to 2004, Joseph Whitaker and Sons Ltd/A&C Black, London
 Church of England Statistics 2002

External links
 

 
676 establishments
Hereford
Hereford
Religion in Herefordshire
7th-century establishments in England